Ida Hegazi Høyer (born 1981) is a Norwegian writer. Of dual Danish-Egyptian heritage, she grew up in Lofoten and Oslo. She has studied sociology in school. She currently lives in  Oslomarka. She won the Bjørnson Stipend from the Norwegian Booksellers Association in 2014. In 2015, she won the EU Prize for Literature for Unnskyld.

Novels 

 Under Verden (2012)
 Ut (2013)
 Unnskyld (2014)
 Fortellingen om øde (2015)
 Historier om trøst (2016)
 Nordisk NU (2017)
 Fortællingen om øde (2017)
 Ene Skissen (2018)
 Kim Friele (2019)
 Ene: Barnet (2019)

References

1981 births
Norwegian women novelists
Norwegian people of Danish descent
Norwegian people of Egyptian descent
Writers from Oslo
Living people